SWIDT; See What I Did There?) are a hip-hop collective from Onehunga, New Zealand. SmokeyGotBeatz debut project SWIDT vs Everybody was listed as No.16 in The New Zealand Herald's 20 Best Albums of 2016. They released their official debut album STONEYHUNGA, dedicated to their home suburb of Onehunga, in July 2017. Members of the collective include SPYCC, SMOKE, INF, Boomer Tha God and JAMAL.

SWIDT were nominated for both the Critics Choice Award, and Best Urban/Hip-Hop Album at the 2016 New Zealand Music Awards. At the Awards, R&B singer Aaradhna Jayantilal Patel refused her award for Best Urban/Hip-Hop Album, claiming that the two disparate categories had been placed together for racial reasons. She gave her award to SWIDT. In her speech refusing the award, Patel described SWIDT as 'the future of hip hop'.

STONEYHUNGA reached number 4 in the New Zealand album charts. SWIDT have been nominated for 6 awards this year leading the nominations list at the 2017 New Zealand Music Awards. The Onehunga group is up for Godfrey Hirst Album of the Year, Vodafone Single of the Year, Best Group, Best Hip Hop Artist, and Vodafone People's Choice – as well as Massey University Best Producer at the Artisan Awards for band member SmokeyGotBeatz.

References 

New Zealand hip hop groups
Musical groups from Auckland